The ashy tailorbird (Orthotomus ruficeps) is a species of bird formerly placed in the "Old World warbler" assemblage, it but now placed in the family Cisticolidae.
It is found in Brunei, Indonesia, Malaysia, Myanmar, the Philippines, Singapore, and Thailand, Vietnam.
Its natural habitats are subtropical or tropical moist lowland forest and subtropical or tropical mangrove forest.

References

External links
Image at ADW 

ashy tailorbird
Birds of Southeast Asia
ashy tailorbird
Taxa named by René Lesson
Taxonomy articles created by Polbot